Hyalurga whiteleyi is a moth of the family Erebidae. It was described by Herbert Druce in 1911. It is found in Ecuador and Peru.

References

 

Hyalurga
Moths described in 1911